Chhatra Sangram (meaning Student's Struggle in English) is a Bengali magazine, the organ of the Students' Federation of India, West Bengal state committee. It has been published since 1964 and played a great role in developing the leftist student movement in West Bengal. Neo Prints is the publisher of the magazine. Its circulation in January–February 2011 was nearly 30,000 copies.

Anil Biswas is the founder editor of the magazine, Diptyajit Das is the Present Editor.
Every Affiliated and Subordinate bodies under the State Committee, has One Person, who is in charge of the Magazine Related Affairs at their level.

See more
Students Struggle

References

Political magazines published in India
Bengali-language magazines
Communist magazines
Magazines established in 1964
Student magazines